David Joseph Steinberg (February 12, 1965 – March 16, 2010) was an American actor best known for his role of Meegosh in the 1988 Ron Howard film Willow.

Steinberg was born in Los Angeles and stood 3'1" (0,93 m) tall. His adoptive parents also had dwarfism. Steinberg was raised in Queens, New York, where he excelled in comedy in school as a way to overcome shyness over his short stature.

He first began acting on stage while studying at Messiah College in Pennsylvania. He switched to professional theater after college. His theater credits included performances with notable theater companies including the Guthrie Theater in Minneapolis, the Center Stage in Baltimore and the New York Shakespeare Festival. He also starred in a Grammy-nominated national touring production of The Wizard of Oz (as a Munchkin) and Baz Luhrmann's production of La bohème in Los Angeles and New York City.

While Steinberg was best known as Meegosh in Willow, his other film credits included roles in The Hebrew Hammer and Love & Sex. His television appearances included a guest spot on the 2007 Ugly Betty episode, Giving Up the Ghost, as well as roles on Zoey 101, Charmed, The Equalizer, Are You Afraid of the Dark? and The Days and Nights of Molly Dodd.

Steinberg moved to Los Angeles in 2004. He died by suicide on March 16, 2010, in Valencia, California, aged 45. The Los Angeles County Coroner determined Steinberg's death as hanging. His interment was at Forest Lawn Memorial Gardens in Plantation, Florida.

Partial filmography
Willow (1988) - Meegosh
 Are You Afraid of the Dark? The Tale of Jake and the Leprechaun (1992) - Sean O'Shaney
Love & Sex (2000) - Tiny Man
The Hebrew Hammer (2003) - Elf Flunky
Fur (2006) - Singing Little Person
Epic Movie (2007) - Oompa Loompa
SpongeBob's Atlantis SquarePantis (2007) - SpongeBob hallucination (uncredited)
Agent One-Half (2008) - Widget
Transylmania (2009) - Dean Floca (final film role)

References

External links

Bye, DAVID J STEINBERG

1965 births
2010 deaths
American male stage actors
American male film actors
American male television actors
People from Queens, New York
Male actors from Los Angeles
Messiah University alumni
Suicides by hanging in California
Actors with dwarfism
2010 suicides